is a Japanese anime director and screenwriter. Much of his work evokes nostalgia for 1970s super robot mecha anime.

Works

Anime
Major works

Minor works
Bremen 4: Angels in Hell (TV film, assistant director, 1981)
Yattodetaman (TV series, assistant director, 1981-1982)
 Combat Mecha Xabungle (TV series, storyboard, 1982-1983)
Tokimeki Tonight (TV series, storyboard, 1982-1983)
Fang of the Sun Dougram (TV series, storyboard, 1981-1983)
Aura Battler Dunbine (TV series, storyboard, 1983-1984)
Heavy Metal L-Gaim (TV series, storyboard, 1984-1985)
Mobile Suit Zeta Gundam (TV series, storyboard, 1984-1985)
Pro Golfer Saru (TV series, storyboard, 1985-1988)
Diary of Our Days at the Breakwater (TV series, episode script, 2020)

Manga
Giant Robo: The Day the Earth Stood Still (with Mari Mizuta, 1992–1993)
Getter Robo Armageddon: Try to Remember (with Hisashi Matsumoto, 2001)
Seven of Seven (with Azusa Kunihiro, 2001–2002)
Giant Robo: The Day the Earth Burned (with Yasunari Toda, 2006–2011)
Chōkyū! Kidō Butōden G Gundam (with Kazuhiko Shimamoto, 2010–2011)

References

External links 

Yasuhiro Imagawa anime at Media Arts Database 

1961 births
Anime directors
Anime screenwriters
Living people